Meana di Susa (French: Méans) is a comune (municipality) in the Metropolitan City of Turin in the Italian region Piedmont, located about 50 km west of Turin.  
Meana di Susa borders the municipalities of Susa, Gravere, Mattie, Usseaux, and Fenestrelle.

The village name is derived from its original Latin name of Mediana, signifying its location as the midpoint on the road from Paris to Rome.   Residents are known as "Meanesi."

From September 1943 until April 1945, Meana served as a hub of the Italian Resistance Movement against the occupying German Nazi Army and their Italian Fascist allies.  Ada Prospero Gobetti established her base there, from which she coordinated and carried out partisan actions.

Events
Each year on the Sunday closest to September 18, the village celebrates the feast of its patron saint, San Costanzo. The festival is centred on the parish church, Santa Maria Assunta. The festival also provides an opportunity for the community to honour the youth who are coming of age.

References

External links
 Official website

Cities and towns in Piedmont